Márton Keleti (27 April 1905 – 20 June 1973) was a Hungarian film director. He directed 50 films between 1937 and 1973. His 1959 film Yesterday was entered into the 1st Moscow International Film Festival.

Selected filmography
 A Tanítónő (1945)
 Mickey Magnate (1949)
 Janika (1949)
 Különös házasság (1951)
 Kiskrajcár (1953)
 Young Hearts (1953)
 Two Confessions (1957)
 Yesterday (1959)
 The Corporal and Others (1965)
 Franz Liszt. Dreams of love (1970)

References

External links

1905 births
1973 deaths
Hungarian film directors